Pseudochrobactrum asaccharolyticum is a Gram-negative, oxidase-positive, non-spore-forming, nonmotile bacterium of the genus Paenochrobactrum.

References

External links
Type strain of Pseudochrobactrum asaccharolyticum at BacDive -  the Bacterial Diversity Metadatabase

Hyphomicrobiales
Bacteria described in 2006